Karl Leslie "Red" Ericson (January 21, 1895 – August 25, 1965) was an American football and basketball coach and college athletics administrator. He served as the head football at Jamestown College—now known as the University of Jamestown—in Jamestown, North Dakota, for eight seasons, from 1922 to 1929, compiling a record of 23–28–4. Ericson was also the head basketball coach and athletic director at Jamestown. 

Ericson was born on January 21, 1895, in Elroy, Wisconsin and moved to North Dakota at the age of 10. After graduating from Jamestown College, he taught and coached at Mandan High School in Mandan, North Dakota.

Head coaching record

College football

References

External links
 

1895 births
1965 deaths
Jamestown Jimmies athletic directors
Jamestown Jimmies football coaches
Jamestown Jimmies men's basketball coaches
High school basketball coaches in North Dakota
High school football coaches in North Dakota
University of Jamestown alumni
People from Elroy, Wisconsin
Coaches of American football from North Dakota